Tirbanibulin, sold under the brand name Klisyri, is a medication for the treatment of actinic keratosis (AKs) on the face or scalp. It functions as a mitotic inhibitor by inhibiting tubulin polymerization and Src kinase signaling can be potentially effective in deferring the development of AKs to squamous cell carcinoma in situ.

The most common side effects include local skin reactions, application site pruritus, and application site pain.

Tirbanibulin was approved for medical use in the United States in December 2020, and in the European Union in July 2021. The US Food and Drug Administration (FDA) considers it to be a first-in-class medication.

Medical uses 
Tirbanibulin is indicated for the topical treatment of actinic keratosis of the face or scalp.

Mechanism of Action 
Tirbanibulin, chemically known as N-benzyl-2-(5-(4-(2-morpholinoethoxy)phenyl) pyridine-2-yl) acetamide, is a microtubule and non–ATP-competitive inhibitor. The drug in various ways mimics the mechanisms of chemotherapy by suspending the protooncogenic Src tyrosine kinase signaling pathway. Notably, it promotes G2/M arrest during cell cycle, upregulates p53, and triggers apoptosis via caspase-3 stimulation and poly (ADP-ribose) polymerase cleavage.

Side effects 
In several studies tirbanibulin has been observed to induce skin reactions at the site of application, ranging from mild to severe erythema, flaking, ulceration, and pain.

As of now, there has been no extensive research conducted on the risks of tirbanibulin usage by specific human populations (i.e., pregnant populations). There also has been no significant differences observed in safety or effectiveness of the drug between geriatric or pediatric populations.

History 
The US Food and Drug Administration (FDA) approved tirbanibulin based on evidence from two clinical trials (Trial 1/ NCT03285477 and Trial 2/NCT03285490) of 702 adults with actinic keratosis on the face or scalp. The trials were conducted at 62 sites in the United States. Participants received once daily treatment with either tirbanibulin or inactive control ointment for 5 consecutive days to the single predetermined area where they had actinic keratosis. Neither the participants nor the health care providers knew which treatment was being given until after the trial was completed. The benefit of tirbanibulin in comparison to control was assessed after 57 days by comparing the percentage of participants who did not have any actinic keratosis on the treatment area (100% clearance).

Society and culture

Legal status 
On 20 May 2021, the Committee for Medicinal Products for Human Use (CHMP) of the European Medicines Agency (EMA) adopted a positive opinion, recommending the granting of a marketing authorization for tirbanibulin, intended for the treatment of actinic keratosis. The applicant for this medicinal product is Almirall, S.A. Tirbanibulin was approved for medical use in the European Union in July 2021.

References

External links 
 
 
 

4-Morpholinyl compunds
Pyridines
Amides
Ethers